Major-General Sir Arthur Lynden Lynden-Bell,  (2 January 1867 – 14 February 1943) was a British Army officer.

Early life
Lynden-Bell was the son of Major-General Thomas Lynden Lynden-Bell and younger brother of Colonel Charles Perceval Lynden-Bell. He was educated at Clifton College."Clifton College Register" Muirhead, J.A.O. p88: Bristol; J.W Arrowsmith for Old Cliftonian Society; April, 1948

Military career
He attended the Royal Military College, Sandhurst and commissioned as a Lieutenant into the Buffs (Royal East Kent Regiment) in May 1885. After promotion to captain on 31 January 1894, he served the following year on the North West Frontier of British India and attended the Staff College, Camberley in 1898. A year later, he saw active service in the Second Boer War, commanding a mounted infantry contingent of the Buffs. He was wounded, and returned home on the SS Greek in March 1900.

In May 1900, he became a Staff Captain for intelligence in the War Office, and the following year he was made Deputy-Assistant Quartermaster-General for intelligence at the War Office on 20 July 1901. He was promoted to major on 3 May 1902, and appointed a Companion of the Order of St Michael and St George (CMG) in 1905. In 1907, Lynden-Bell became General Staff Officer Southern Command and in 1911, he became General Staff Officer Lowland Division.

At the start of the World War I Lynden-Bell was Assistant Quartermaster-General of the British Expeditionary Force. In 1915 he served as Chief of General Staff of the Mediterranean and Egypt Expeditionary Force, and saw service in the Gallipoli Campaign, being Mentioned in Dispatches. In 1916-1917 he was the Chief-of-Staff of the Egyptian Expeditionary Force under General Sir Archibald Murray, but was removed from the post and returned home in mid-1917 soon after the arrival of Edmund Allenby in Cairo to replace Murray.

Lynden-Bell was appointed a Commander of the Legion of Honour in 1917. In 1918 he was Director of Staff Duties at the War Office.

He retired from the regular army in 1924, and in 1928 became Colonel of the Buffs, serving in the position until 1 January 1937.

Later years
In retirement, he served as a Deputy Lieutenant and as a Justice of the Peace and was a "very keen supporter" of Kent County Cricket Club, always attending Canterbury Cricket Week in the Buff's tent at the St Lawrence Ground.

Death
Lynden-Bell died at Platt near Sevenoaks in Kent in 1943, aged 76.

Personal life
He married the Hon. Bertha Marion Akers-Douglas, daughter of Aretas Akers-Douglas, 1st Viscount Chilston and Adeline Mary Austen-Smith, on 2 June 1905.

Cultural references
He appears in the war memoir Seven Pillars of Wisdom by T. E. Lawrence.

References

External links
 

1867 births
1943 deaths
Knights Commander of the Order of the Bath
Knights Commander of the Order of St Michael and St George
Commandeurs of the Légion d'honneur
Deputy Lieutenants of Kent
English justices of the peace
People educated at Clifton College
Graduates of the Royal Military College, Sandhurst
Buffs (Royal East Kent Regiment) officers
British Army major generals
British Army personnel of the Second Boer War
British Army personnel of World War I